Nigeria is a federal republic in West Africa, bordering Benin in the west, Chad and Cameroon in the east, and Niger in the north.  Nigeria is the world's 20th largest economy, worth more than $500 billion and $1 trillion in terms of nominal GDP and purchasing power parity respectively. It overtook South Africa to become Africa's largest economy in 2014. The 2013 debt-to-GDP ratio was 11 percent. Nigeria is considered to be an emerging market by the World Bank; it has been identified as a regional power on the African continent, a middle power in international affairs, and has also been identified as an emerging global power. Nigeria is a member of the MINT group of countries, which are widely seen as the globe's next "BRIC-like" economies. It is also listed among the "Next Eleven" economies set to become among the biggest in the world. Nigeria is a founding member of the African Union and a member of many other international organizations, including the United Nations, the Commonwealth of Nations and OPEC.

For further information on the types of business entities in this country and their abbreviations, see "Business entities in Nigeria".

Notable firms 
This list includes notable companies with primary headquarters located in the country. The industry and sector follow the Industry Classification Benchmark taxonomy. Organizations which have ceased operations are included and noted as defunct. Most of these companies (defunct or thriving) had or have their head offices in Lagos State of Nigeria. Lagos is unofficially recognized as the Commercial Capital of Nigeria.

See also 
 Nigerian Stock Exchange
 List of airlines of Nigeria

References 

 
Nigeria